Ari L. Goldman (born September 22, 1949) is an American professor and journalist. He is professor of journalism at Columbia University and a former reporter for The New York Times.

Early life and education 
Goldman attended the Rabbi Jacob Joseph School on the Lower East Side of Manhattan. He was educated at Yeshiva University, Columbia and Harvard.

Career 
Goldman is a tenured professor at Columbia, where he directs the Scripps Howard Program on Religion, Journalism and the Spiritual Life. The program has enabled him to take his "Covering Religion" seminar on study tours of Israel, Ireland, Italy, Russia and India. His former students have gone on to be religion writers at such papers as the Chicago Tribune, the Miami Herald, The Baltimore Sun and the Raleigh News & Observer.

Goldman has been a Fulbright Professor in Israel, a Skirball Fellow at Oxford University in England and a scholar-in-residence at Stern College for Women.

Goldman is a founding faculty member of the School of the New York Times, a high school program that started in 2016. He has also been a lecturer for Times Journeys.

Personal life 
Professor Goldman and his wife Shira Dicker live in New York City and are the parents of three children. He is the father of the journalist Adam Joachim (A.J.) Goldmann. Goldman is the nephew of Rabbi Dr. Norman Lamm. He is a Modern Orthodox Jew.

Books

 The Search for God at Harvard (1991)
 Being Jewish (2000)
 Living A Year of Kaddish (2003)
 The Late Starters Orchestra (2014)

References

External links 
 Official web site
 Ari Goldman: A journalist and a Jew, by  URIEL HEILMAN, Jerusalem Post Literary Quarterly, https://web.archive.org/web/20080904214640/http://info.jpost.com/C003/Supplements/LQ2003/art.09.html

Columbia University faculty
Columbia University Graduate School of Journalism faculty
Living people
The New York Times writers
Writers from Hartford, Connecticut
American Modern Orthodox Jews
Rabbi Jacob Joseph School alumni
Yeshiva University alumni
1949 births
Jewish American academics
20th-century American journalists
American male journalists
21st-century American Jews